Strider may refer to:

Literature 
 Strider, standard English title of Leo Tolstoy's novella Kholstomer
 Strider (novel), a juvenile fiction novel by Beverly Cleary
 Strider, an alias of Aragorn, a character from The Lord of the Rings by J.R.R. Tolkien
 Strider, a giant mecha (walking vehicle) in Stanisław Lem's 1987 novel Fiasco
 Dave and Dirk Strider, fictional characters from the webcomic Homestuck

Manga and video games
Strider Hiryu, a manga and video game character who has starred in the following titles
Strider (1988 manga), a 1988 manga by Moto Kikaku
Strider (1989 arcade game), a 1989 action game by Capcom
Strider (1989 NES video game), a different 1989 game starring the same character
Strider II (1990 video game), sequel to the arcade game by Tiertex
Strider 2 (1999 video game), sequel to the 1989 arcade game by Capcom
Strider (2014 video game), a new game in the series developed by Double Helix Games and Capcom
 Strider, a type of Combine machine/bio-engineered creature from the Half-Life video game universe
 Strider, an agility-based vocation in the Dragon's Dogma video games
 Strider Squadron, the player's fighter squadron in Ace Combat 7: Skies Unknown
 Strider, a mob found in the nether dimension in Minecraft

People
Burns Strider (born 1966), American consultant, lobbyist and former political aide
Marjorie Strider (born 1934), American painter and sculptor performance
Spencer Strider (born 1998), American baseball pitcher
Tinchy Stryder (born 1986), Ghanaian-British rapper and singer-songwriter

Other 
Strider Wildlife Management Area, in Maryland
Strider Farm, West Virginia, a site of frequent fighting during the American Civil War
Strider Knives, a knife production company
Strider SMF, a knife developed by the company for the U.S. Marine Corps
Alexander Strider, a bus manufactured by Walter Alexander Coachbuilders

See also
Water strider, a member of the insect family Gerridae
Stridor, the sound made by someone with a breathing difficulty
Bron-Y-Aur Stomp, a song with lyrics about a dog named Strider